Solter is a surname. Notable people with the surname include:

Aletha Solter (born 1945), Swiss–American developmental psychologist
Davor Solter, developmental biologist
George A. Solter (1873–1950), American judge and lawyer
Harry Solter (1873–1920), American actor, screenwriter and director
Petra Sölter, also known as Petra Voge (born 1962), East German cross-country skier
Scott Solter, American musician

See also
Salter (surname)